Barbara Ntambirweki Karugonjo is a lawyer, academic, and activist in Uganda. She is a lecturer in the faculty of law at Uganda Pentecostal University, a private university.

Background and education
Ntambirweki has a Bachelor of Laws degree from Makerere University, Uganda's oldest and largest public university. She also has a Diploma in Legal Practice from the Law Development Center. Her Master of Laws degree was obtained from the University of Cape Town in South Africa.

Career
She is a lecturer in the faculty of law at the Kampala campus of Uganda Pentecostal University. She also serves as an advocate in the law firm of Ntambirweki Kandeebe & Company Advocates, specializing in commercial transactions, litigation, and administrative law. She concurrently works as a research officer the Advocates Coalition for Development and Environment organization, where she "provides both research and administrative support to the various projects under the Programme".

In her personal writings, Ntabirweki recognizes the dominance of agriculture in the national economy. She argues that to maximize agricultural output, the application of science and technology is critically important. She has criticized the small funding by the Ugandan government of agricultural research.

See also
Sylvia Tamale
Zahara Nampewo
Judiciary of Uganda
 List of university leaders in Uganda

References

External links
  Constitutional Court Dismisses MPs “Bribe” Case
 Involve Youth In Agricultural Development To Solve Economic Crisis
Website of Uganda Pentecostal University

1975 births
Living people
Toro people
People from Kabarole District
People from Western Region, Uganda
Makerere University alumni
University of Cape Town alumni
21st-century Ugandan lawyers
Ugandan women lawyers
Ugandan activists
Ugandan women activists
Ugandan women academics
Law Development Centre alumni
Academic staff of Uganda Pentecostal University